Eleanor Henta Fazan OBE (born 29 May 1929), is a Kenyan-born British actress and choreographer. She is best known for her roles in productions: Willow, Hot Fuzz and Lassiter. A highly talented film choreographer and a dancer in her era, Eleanor was awarded the Order of the British Empire in the 2013 Queen's New Years Honours List in 2013.

Personal life
She was born on 29 May 1929 in Kenya. She later trained in dancing with Sadler's Wells Ballet (currently known as 'The Royal Ballet'). Later she joined with the Arts Educational School.

She was married to the British composer Stanley Myers in 1955, and they had one son.

Career
In 1959, Fazan directed One to Another, a revue at the Lyric Opera House in Hammersmith written by Bamber Gascoigne, John Cranko, John Mortimer, N. F. Simpson, and Harold Pinter, amongst others. It starred Beryl Reid, Patrick Wymark, Joe Melia Sheila Hancock and Ray Barrett. In 1960 she was choreographer for The Lily White Boys, directed by Lindsay Anderson at the Royal Court. In 1961 she was the director of Beyond the Fringe, when it began its initial London run at the Fortune Theatre. In 1974, she made her Royal Opera debut on Der Ring des Nibelungen, directed by Götz Friedrich. She made phenomenal work in Royal Opera, where she contributed to numerous plays in the following years under the prominent theater directors Elijah Moshinsk, John Copley, Friedrich and John Schlesinger in their plays such as: Peter Grimes, Lohengrin, The Rake’s Progress, Macbeth, Samson, Otello, Attila, Ariadne auf Naxos, Semele, Idomeneo, re di Creta, Elektra, Les Contes d’Hoffmann and Der Rosenkavalier.

Meanwhile, she entered cinema as a choreographer as well as actress where she appeared in Oh! What a Lovely War, Heaven’s Gate, Willow, Cold Comfort Farm, Mrs Henderson Presents and Hot Fuzz. In 1993, she was awarded with the Industry Award from British Film Institute.

Partial filmography

References

External links
 
 FIZ and some Theatre Giants by Eleanor Fazan

Living people
British choreographers
1930 births
Kenyan emigrants to the United Kingdom
British actresses
20th-century British actresses